Diocese of Soroti may refer to the following ecclesiastical jurisdictions:
 Anglican Diocese of Soroti (f. 1961), Eastern Uganda
 Roman Catholic Diocese of Soroti (f. 1980), Eastern Uganda